The 2019 Slough Borough Council election took place on 2 May 2019 to elect members of Slough Borough Council in England. This was on the same day as other local elections.

Ward results

Baylis & Stoke

Britwell and Northborough

Central

Chalvey

Cippenham Green

Cippenham Meadows

Colnbrook with Poyle

Elliman

Farnham

Haymill and Lynch Hill

Langley Kedermister

Langley St. Mary's

Upton

Wexham Lea

References

2019
2019 English local elections